Thumbelina (born May 1, 2001, died in 2018) was a dwarf miniature horse and the smallest horse on record. Thumbelina was born in St. Louis, Missouri. Her owners, Paul and Kay Goessling, and her handler, Michael Goessling, Nadja and Jaka Lesnik cared for her along with other miniature horses on their farm in Ladue. Thumbelina died in 2018.

See also
Black Beauty, the previous horse often recognized as the smallest.

References

External links
Thumbelina - the World's Smallest Horse

2001 animal births
Miniature horses